The Seventh Commandment is a 1932 American crime film directed by Dwain Esper and James P. Hogan and starring Victoria Vinton, George LeMaire and James Harrison. It was produced on Poverty Row as a second feature. The title refers to the Seventh Commandment "Thou shalt not commit adultery". It is now considered a lost film.

Synopsis
A young man from the country heads to a big city in order to make his fortune. However he soon falls in with bad company, taking part in games of strip poker and promiscuous activities. Disgusted by such a life he returns to his hometown and plans to marry his childhood sweetheart Mary, but is alarmed to discover he has caught syphilis.

Cast
 Stuart James as David Hayes
 Victoria Vinton as	Mary Townley
 George LeMaire as	Cubby 
 James Harrison as 	Numbscull 
 Maxine Collins as 	Vi
 Virginia Griffith as 	Sue
 Martha Heath as Fanny
 Alma Powell as Ma Townley
 William Malan a s	Pa Townley
 Frank Schwab as 	Gloomy
 Edward Carlie as 	The Doctor
 Horace B. Carpenter as The Quack Doctor 
 Marion Sterly as 	Rose
 E. Alyn Warren as The Philosopher

References

Bibliography
 Pitts, Michael R. Poverty Row Studios, 1929–1940. McFarland & Company, 2005.

External links
 

1932 films
1932 crime films
1930s English-language films
American crime films
Films directed by James Patrick Hogan
American black-and-white films
1930s American films